KARV (610 kHz and 101.3 MHz) are commercial radio stations licensed to Russellville, Arkansas, United States.  KARV-AM-FM are owned by Bobby Caldwell's EAB of Russellville, LLC.  They carry a news/talk radio format, with a mix of local and national programs.  Syndicated programs on KARV-AM-FM include Rush Limbaugh.

History

Early Years on 1490 AM
On February 25, 1947, the radio station first signed on as KXRJ.  It was set up on the campus of Arkansas Tech University.  The station operated with 250 watts on 1490 AM, and was a network affiliate of the Mutual Broadcasting System. The original owners were Russ Horne and Jerrell Shepherd, who were brothers-in-law.  In the early 1950s, Shepherd sold his interests in the station and started a successful broadcasting company based in Moberly, Missouri.  The Horne Family operated the radio station for a number of years, growing its popularity.

In 1968, the radio station changed its call sign from KXRJ to KARV, standing for the Arkansas River Valley.  Station ownership moved from Russ Horne to his son Mike. The family also owned KWCK-KSER in Searcy, Arkansas. During the 1960s and 1970s, the stations were managed by L.L. "Doc" Bryan, who would go on to serve the Russellville area as a state representative, and was later the Arkansas legislature's Speaker of the House.  After Bryan departed, Kermit Womack became the General Manager of the station.

Move to AM 610
In 1980, KARV made the move from 1490 AM to the more powerful frequency of 610 AM.  With its low spot on the dial, KARV 610 covers a large chunk of the state of Arkansas. A new four tower directional array was built outside of Arkansas Tech's campus. The same year, Womack departed KARV to operate his own station in Rogers, Arkansas.

During the 1980s, the Horne Family operated successful radio stations in Texas, Kansas, and would later acquire KMUS and KKWK in Muskogee, Oklahoma.  Later beset by financial problems, Horne sold all of his stations. In 1992, KARV was sold for $250,000 to former manager Kermit Womack.  In 1998, KARV signed on an FM station at 101.3 FM, licensed to Ola, Arkansas. In 2001, the Womack Family signed on 105.5 KYEL in Danville.

Personalities
In 1998, longtime personalities Johnny Story and Tom Kamerling, along with several key sales and administrative employees, moved to the River Valley Radio group consisting of KCJC, KWKK, KCAB, and KVLD.

In 2016, the three stations were sold to EAB of Russellville, LLC, owners of the four competing radio stations. Much of the news/talk programming airing on former competitor KCAB-AM is now airing on KARV as of November 2016.

A number of notable broadcasters worked at KARV through the years including:
 Johnny Story, longtime Russellville market broadcaster who worked at the station from 1976 to 1998
 Tom Kamerling, longtime Russellville market broadcaster who served several tours of duty at the station
 L.L. "Doc" Bryan, longtime member of the Arkansas legislature
 Congressman Steve Womack (R-Arkansas), son of former owner Kermit Womack
 Max Morgan, longtime Dallas-Fort Worth television personality (died 2014)
 Joe Fisher, current superintendent of the Atkins, Arkansas School District
 Chuck Barrett, current play-by-play voice of the Arkansas Razorbacks
 Grant Merrill, former Arkansas Radio Network talk show host and Arkansas radio station owner
 David Wallace, longtime news anchor for the Arkansas Radio Network
 Rita Richardson, former Arkansas Radio Network news anchor
 Eric Sullivan, afternoon sports talk show host on KABZ-FM in Little Rock
 Tommy Craft, statewide sports talk show host
 Alan Risener, longtime Arkansas radio station owner (died 2015)
 Paul Coates, longtime Arkansas radio station owner
 Jim Moore, New York Times bestselling author

References

External links

ARV
News and talk radio stations in the United States
Russellville, Arkansas